Karayakup can refer to:

 Karayakup, Bartın
 Karayakup, Erdemli
 Karayakup, Göynücek
 Karayakup, Kayapınar